The August curse has been perceived as a phenomenon in Russia, where from 1991 to 2001, the worst disasters and adverse events seem to have occurred in August. Many possible explanations have been presented for this observation, ranging from fact-based to supernatural.

Overview
In the early 21st century, journalists and observers noted that, since 1991, an unusual number of severe and fatal events in Russia had occurred in the month of August. Examples included deadly accidents and incidents, terrorist attacks, and the outbreak of two major wars.

Explanation attempts
Russian media has speculated about possible explanations for such clustering. Seasonal influence on human activities, as opposed to the relative shutdown in winter, for instance, are among them.

For instance, many people take vacations in August: this leaves a kind of power-vacuum at some levels which terrorists and criminals can exploit.

Evgeny Nadorshin, chief economist at Trust Bank, has said that, for many events, the occurrence in August is simply a coincidence. But Nadorshin noted that vacations and official inattention were key factors in enabling the 2009 Nazran bombing.

Others have presented supernatural explanations for the August curse. Astrologist Elena Kuznetsova said in 2009, that the chaos will likely continue until mid-September because of the relative positions of Saturn and Uranus, and that Russia's horoscope is directly connected to the annual August turmoil.

The usually hot weather of August was identified in 2001 as a contributing factor. It is a time when military or insurgent actions can be undertaken.

Other far-reaching historical events have occurred in August in Russia, a prime time for military movements. For example, the Eastern Front of World War I was opened in August 1914 with the German invasion of Congress Poland, part of the Russian Empire. Germany started the  Battle of Stalingrad that month (23 August 1942), in which the Soviets were eventually victorious.

Examples

See also
Apophenia
Confirmation bias
Tisha B'Av

References

History of Russia (1991–present)
August
Curses